Nektar (German for nectar) is an English progressive rock band formed in Hamburg, West Germany in 1969, by guitarist and lead vocalist Roye Albrighton, keyboardist Allan "Taff" Freeman, bassist Derek "Mo" Moore, and drummer Ron Howden.

History

1969–1973: Early years
The band formed in Hamburg, West Germany in 1969. The founding members were Englishmen Roye Albrighton on guitars and lead vocals, Allan "Taff" Freeman on keyboards, Derek "Mo" Moore on bass, Ron Howden on drums and artists Mick Brockett and Keith Walters on lights and "special effects". Though the concept of non-performing bandmembers was not unprecedented (e.g. lyricist Keith Reid in Procol Harum), it was unusual that a third of Nektar's lineup had no role in performing or writing their music. Throughout their early existence the band's songwriting was credited to all six members on the album sleeves, but BMI records show that the music was written by the four performing members. Brockett did however co-write the lyrics with Moore, and invented or contributed to the original album titles.

The band's debut album, Journey to the Centre of the Eye (1971), consisted of a single song running over 40 minutes, with the last 100 seconds of the first side repeated at the beginning of the second side to maintain continuity. It was a concept album, following an astronaut who is given overwhelming knowledge by extraterrestrials, with sonic textures reminiscent of psychedelic rock. The follow-up, A Tab in the Ocean (1972), drew on more conventional rock and blues influences. Walters had left by the time of their third album, the heavily improvised double album ...Sounds Like This (1973), though the band would continue to use his art in their shows and album designs for a time. A cult following grew for the band, based largely on word of mouth.

1973–1982: Height of success and disbanding
Nektar's U.S. release, Remember the Future (1973), propelled the band briefly into mass popularity. A concept album revisiting Journey to the Centre of the Eyes theme of extraterrestrials granting a human enlightenment, but with a blind boy as the protagonist. It demonstrated a much more melodic sound than previous albums and shot into the Top 20 album charts in the U.S. The follow-up, Down to Earth (1974), was another concept album (this time with a circus theme); it also sold well, breaking into the Top 40 album charts and including their only song to chart on the Billboard singles charts, "Astral Man". The next album, Recycled (1975), was stylistically close to bands like Gentle Giant and carried on the band's close connection with progressive rock.

Albrighton left the band in December 1976, just prior to the studio sessions for Nektar's first major-label release, Magic Is a Child (1977). The remaining members were joined by guitarist/vocalist Dave Nelson at this point. The album was more eclectic, although with shorter songs and fairly straightforward rhythms. Lyrically the album covered a wide range of subjects from Norse mythology and magic to more down to earth subjects like railroads and truck drivers.

In 1978 the band dissolved; however in 1979 Albrighton and Freeman reformed the band with bassist Carmine Rojas and drummer Dave Prater and released a new album, Man in the Moon (1980), before the band dissolved once again in 1982.

Ian Curtis of Joy Division was a fan of the band and was photographed before he joined the band in a Nektar T-shirt.

2000–present: Reformation and New Nektar

2000–2018: Reformation
Nektar regrouped in 2000 with a line-up consisting of Albrighton, Freeman, and drummer Ray Hardwick, and in 2001, they released The Prodigal Son (2001). The following year, the band headlined NEARfest with the full classic line-up including Moore on bass, Howden on drums, and Larry Fast guesting on synthesizers. In 2003, Moore departed the band and was replaced by Randy Dembo. Nektar cut one more album, Evolution (2004), before Freeman was replaced by Tom Hughes. Dembo and Hughes left in August 2006, citing communication problems, money issues, personality issues, and trust in the management issues. Dembo was briefly replaced by a returning Carmine Rojas, before the band settled on a line-up that consisted of Albrighton, Howden, guitarist Steve Adams, bassist Desha Dunnahoe, and keyboardist Steve Mattern. However, this line up never performed live on stage.

Later in 2006, the band found new management in Roy Clay to replace The Eclectic Records staff, and performed at progressive rock-themed festivals worldwide on a part-time basis, and occasionally appearing in some of their old haunts in the New Jersey/New York area. Clay was released from management duties early 2007 after a dispute over financial matters, and the band made an official complaint which exposed further fraudulent acts. Clay was ultimately convicted for fraud, lying, and forgery, and was jailed for 2 years and 11 months.

In mid-2007, a solo tour was undertaken by Albrighton. A full band tour of Europe (primarily Germany) was scheduled by a European-based promoter, but they had to postpone as extra funds were needed to complete the new album, Book of Days, which was not released until the following year, by which time Adams, Dunnahoe, and Mattern had departed the band. Book of Days featured more of Roye Albrighton's guitar work than previous Nektar albums.

In late 2007, the band embarked on a tour for which they performed Remember the Future in its entirety, the line-up now including Klaus Henatsch on keyboards and Peter Pichl on bass. In this formation they toured extensively through Europe in 2008. These concerts resulted in the highly acclaimed live double album Fortyfied (2011), which was released in 2009 under Roye's own Treacle Music label. In 2009, the band also played their first gig in the US again, appearing as headliners at the Rites of Spring Festival and a week-long tour along the East Coast.

In mid 2011, Lux Vibratus joined the band on bass for the Cleopatra Records' Space Rock Invasion Tour in the U.S. By the time the band came to record the covers album A Spoonful of Time (2012), bass duties were shared by session musician Jürgen Engler, Mr. Big bassist Billy Sheehan, and former Yes member Billy Sherwood, who also served as the album's producer. The Albrighton-Howden-Henatsch-Sherwood line-up recorded and released Time Machine (2013). A special post-recording show was put together at the Coach House in South Orange County, California. Returning to Nektar in 2013, Vibratus was on bass for the Cruise to the Edge voyage, followed by The Virada Cultural Festival in São Paulo, Brazil. In June, this line-up went on the road again for a U.S. tour billed as the U.K. Legends of Classic Rock. In January 2014, bassist Tom Fry joined the band for a European tour. On this tour Che Albrighton, Roye's son, made his first appearance as a drummer because Howden had a different engagement. Che had previously worked as tour manager for Nektar on several tours.

On 26 July 2016, Roye Albrighton died after an unspecified illness, at the age of 67. Following his death, Henatsch, Howden, and Fry decided to move on with the production of a new album with On Stage Records, the label they worked with since 2015. The first release was the double live album Live in Bremen (2017), which documents the last tour with Albrighton. After an audition in 2017, Henatsch, Howden, and Fry agreed to continue Nektar with Alexander Hoffmeister as their new frontman and guitarist.

2018–present: Nektar (US-based band)
In early 2018, Howden left the band to found his own group, also named Nektar, and based in the US. He asked former bass player Moore to join, to which he agreed, which was followed by the addition of former members Randy Dembo, Mick Brockett (lights, projections and atmosphere), and Ryche Chlanda (guitar and vocals), and newcomer keyboardist Kendall Scott, a friend of Chlanda's. 

The US line-up assembled a set of previously unrecorded tracks from Chlanda's time in the band, which were released on The Other Side (2020) as Nektar.

2018–present: New Nektar (Germany-based band)
The Germany-based Nektar has operated under a new name, New Nektar, to create some distinction and distance from old successes. In 2018, New Nektar recorded the concept album Megalomania (2018), featuring Che Albrighton on drums, and completed the Megalomania Release Tour in December 2018. Che Albrighton was unavailable to participate, so he was replaced by Norbert "Panza" Lehmann.

Original Nektar keyboardist Allan "Taff" Freeman died in August 2021 at the age of 76.

Personnel

Current members

United States-based band (since 2018) 
Ron Howden – drums, percussion, backing vocals (1969–1978, 2003–2016, 2019–present)
Derek "Mo" Moore – bass, keyboards, vocals and lyrics (1969–1978, 2002–2003, 2019–present)
Mick Brockett – special effects, lyrics (1969–1977, 2002, 2019–present)
Ryche Chlanda – guitars, vocals (1978, 2019–present)
Randy Dembo – bass, bass pedals, backing vocals (2003–2006, 2019–present)
Kendall Scott – keyboards (2019–present)

Germany-based band (also known as New Nektar since 2018) 
 Klaus Henatsch – keyboards, backing vocals (2007–present)
 Alexander Hoffmeister – vocals, guitars (2017–present)
 Norbert "Panza" Lehmann – drums, backing vocals (2018–present)
 Holger Trull – bass, backing vocals (2021–present)

Former members 

Roye Albrighton – guitars, bass, lead vocals (1969–1976, 1978, 1979–1982, 2000–2016; his death)
Allan "Taff" Freeman – keyboards, synthesisers, backing vocals (1969–1978, 1979–1980, 2000–2004; died 2021)
Keith Walters – special effects (1969–1972)
Larry Fast – synthesisers (1975–1978, 2002–2003)
Dave Nelson – guitars, lead vocals (1976–1978)
Dave Prater – drums, percussion, backing vocals (1979–1982)
Carmine Rojas – bass, backing vocals (1979–1982, 2006)
Tommi Schmidt – keyboards, backing vocals (1980–1982)

Ray Hardwick – drums, percussion (2000–2003)
Scott Krentz – percussion, vocals (2002)
Tom Hughes – keyboards, backing vocals (2004–2006)
Steve Adams – guitars, backing vocals (2006–2007)
Desha Dunnahoe – bass, backing vocals (2006–2007)
Steve Mattern – keyboards (2006–2007)
Peter Pichl – bass (2007–2011)
Lux Vibratus – bass (2011–2014)
Tom Fry – bass (2014–2019)
Billy Sherwood – bass (2013)
Che Albrighton – drums (2014, 2018)
 Heike Nolden – bass (2019–2021)

Line-ups 
Note: bold indicates a line-up change; (*) indicates returning member

Nektar

Nektar (US-based band)

Discography

Studio albums

Live albums 

2021 "Sounds Like Swiss"

Compilation albums

Singles

Videography

Video albums

References

External links 
 The US Nektar web site
 The Nektar Project: the classic Nektar years from 1969 to 2003
 
 
 2010 interview with Roye Albrighton
 onstage management of NEKTAR

Musical groups established in 1969
English progressive rock groups
German progressive rock groups
Musical groups from Hamburg
English space rock musical groups
German space rock musical groups
Bellaphon Records artists
Polydor Records artists
Decca Records artists